Gordonia hankookensis is a Gram-positive, aerobic and non-motile bacterium from the genus Gordonia.

References

Further reading

External links
Type strain of Gordonia hankookensis at BacDive -  the Bacterial Diversity Metadatabase	

Mycobacteriales
Bacteria described in 2009